The 1870 Grand National was the 32nd renewal of the Grand National horse race that took place at Aintree Racecourse near Liverpool, England, on 9 March 1870. This was the fifth and final time George Stevens rode the winner in the Grand National.

Media Coverage and Aftermath
In a publicity stunt before this year's race, an athlete by the name of Tom Scott jumped a circuit of the course without the assistance of a horse. At this time the course was still not fully laid to turf and some of the obstacles were still natural hedges and banks making this a difficult two mile cross country run.

Finishing Order

Non-finishers

References

 1870
Grand National
Grand National
19th century in Lancashire
March 1870 sports events